Sedliacka Dubová is a village and municipality in Dolný Kubín District in the Žilina Region of northern Slovakia. It is situated at 594 m (1949 ft) and has about 513 inhabitants.

Peter Colotka, who was the prime minister of the Slovak Socialist Republic from 1969 to 1988, is a native of the village.

References

External links
 Sedliacka Dubová village website (update in Slovak)
Sedliacka Dubová village website (out of date in English)
photo gallery

Villages and municipalities in Dolný Kubín District